Melis Sezer (born 2 June 1993) is a Turkish tennis player.

On 3 March 2014, she reached her best singles ranking of world No. 336. On 19 May 2014, she peaked at No. 219 in the doubles rankings. Sezer has won nine singles and 37 doubles titles on the ITF Circuit. Playing for Turkey Fed Cup team, she has a win–loss record of 3–4. She is a member of the Enkaspor tennis team.

ITF Circuit finals

Singles: 20 (9 titles, 11 runner-ups)

Doubles: 66 (37 titles, 29 runner-ups)

See also
 Turkish women in sports

References

External links
 
 
 

1993 births
Living people
Turkish female tennis players
Sportspeople from İzmir
Enkaspor tennis players
21st-century Turkish women